Colonel Archibald Cecil Thomas White  (5 October 1890 – 20 May 1971) was an English recipient of the Victoria Cross, the highest and most prestigious award for gallantry in the face of the enemy that can be awarded to British and Commonwealth forces.

White was 25 years old, and a temporary captain in the 6th (Service) Battalion, Alexandra, Princess of Wales's Own (Yorkshire Regiment), later known as the Green Howards, British Army during the First World War when the following deed took place for which he was awarded the VC.

During the period 21 September to 1 October 1916 at Stuff Redoubt, France, Captain White was in command of the troops which held the southern and western faces of a redoubt. For four days and nights by skilful disposition he held the position under heavy fire of all kinds and against several counterattacks. Although short of supplies and ammunition, his determination never wavered and when the enemy attacked in greatly superior numbers and had almost ejected our troops from the redoubt, he personally led a counter-attack which finally cleared the enemy out of the southern and western faces.

He later transferred to the Army Education Corps and achieved the rank of colonel. He wrote a history of the corps, published in 1963.

His Victoria Cross is displayed at the Green Howards Museum in Richmond, North Yorkshire, England.  A book on his life and that of his schoolfriend and fellow VC Donald Simpson Bell called 'A Breed Apart' by Richard Leake was published by Great North Publishing in 2008.  "The story of White and Bell deserves to be known by a wider audience.  To have two school friends both awarded the VC on the same battlefield is probably unique in British military history," said Richard Leake.

References

Monuments to Courage (David Harvey, 1999)
The Register of the Victoria Cross (This England, 1997)
VCs of the First World War - The Somme (Gerald Gliddon, 1994)

External links

Location of grave and VC medal (Woking Crematorium)
 

1890 births
1971 deaths
Green Howards officers
Royal Army Educational Corps officers
British Army personnel of World War I
British Battle of the Somme recipients of the Victoria Cross
Recipients of the Military Cross
People from Boroughbridge
Alumni of King's College London
British Army personnel of the Russian Civil War
British Army personnel of World War II
Military personnel from Yorkshire
Fellows of King's College London
British Army recipients of the Victoria Cross